Freddy David (born January 21, 1965) is a former football player.

He previously managed Hapoel Petah Tikva, Maccabi Herzliya, Bnei Sakhnin, Maccabi Petah Tikva, and Hapoel Ramat Gan.

Honours
Toto Cup
 2007
 Toto Cup (Leumit)
 2011
 Liga Leumit
 2011-12

References

1965 births
Living people
Israeli footballers
Maccabi Petah Tikva F.C. players
Israeli football managers
Hapoel Petah Tikva F.C. managers
Maccabi Herzliya F.C. managers
Bnei Sakhnin F.C. managers
Maccabi Petah Tikva F.C. managers
Hapoel Ramat Gan F.C. managers
Hapoel Tel Aviv F.C. managers
Hapoel Katamon Jerusalem F.C. managers
Association footballers not categorized by position